The Farman F.120 and its derivatives were a family of multi-engine airliners and bombers of the 1920s built by the Farman Aviation Works in France.

Design and development
The Jabiru, which was named after a Latin American stork, was a fixed-undercarriage sesquiplane powered by either two, three or four engines, depending on the variant. It featured an unusually broad chord, low aspect-ratio main wing and a very deep fuselage. The tri-motor variant had the centerline engine mounted high, giving it an unusual appearance.

The F.121 or F.3X was the first version to fly, with four 180 hp Hispano-Suiza 8Ac V8 engines mounted in tandem push-pull pairs mounted on stub wings, however this caused cooling problems for the rear engines and the F.120/F.4X version followed shortly afterwards, powered by three 300 hp Salmson Az.9 radial engines. Development continued and a single F.122, modified from an F.4X, was powered by two 400 hp Lorraine 12Db engines. Two military versions were also built, the F.123 with two 450 hp Hispano-Suiza 12Hb V12s, or F.124 with two 420 hp Gnome et Rhône 9Ad Jupiter radial engines.

Operational history
Despite being most commonly seen in lists of ugliest aircraft, following its first flight in 1923 it won a French airliner competition, the 1923 Grand Prix des Avions de Transports and its 500,000 francs first prize, before seeing service with several European airlines.
The Jabiru was capable of carrying up to 9 passengers, and served on Farman airline's route Paris-Brussels-Amsterdam, but also with Danish Air Lines between Copenhagen and Amsterdam. They served until the late 1920s.

Variants

F.120 A single engined biplane bomber, powered by a  Lorraine 12Da engine. First flown in 1924, only two F.120 bombers were built.
F.4X The original designation of the F.120 Jabiru
F.120 Jabiru Four transport monoplanes powered by 3x  Salmson 9AZ water-cooled radial engines.
F.3bis A twin engined transport aircraft powered by 2x  Lorraine 12Db engines, 1 built.
F.3X The original designation of the F.121 Jabiru prototype.
F.121 Jabiru Nine transport aircraft powered by 4x  Hispano-Suiza 8Ac engines, one also modified from a F.120 Jabiru.
F.122 A single transport aircraft powered by 2x  Lorraine 12Db engines.
F.123 A single three-seater bomber powered by 2x  Hispano-Suiza 12Hb engines.
F.124 A single three-seater bomber powered by 2x  Gnome et Rhône 9Ad Jupiter engines.

Civil operators

 Danish Air Lines

 Farman airlines

Specifications (F.121)

Tom Bihn logo
American baggage manufacturer Tom Bihn uses a Farman F.121 Jabiru in its logo.

References

Bibliography

External links 

 Farman F.121 Jabiru in Danish service

1920s French airliners
F.0120
Sesquiplanes
Trimotors
Four-engined push-pull aircraft
Aircraft first flown in 1923
Twin piston-engined tractor aircraft